Basichlamys is a monotypic genus of colonial green algae in the family Tetrabaenaceae. The sole species is Basichlamys sacculifera. The 4-celled colony forms a flat disc.

References

External links
Basichlamys - Description with pictures

Chlamydomonadales
Chlamydomonadales genera
Monotypic algae genera